Ðenovići is a village in the municipality of Herceg Novi, Montenegro.

Demographics
According to the 2011 census, the village has a population of 1,161 people.

Notable people
Vjenceslav Čižek, poet

References

Populated places in Herceg Novi Municipality
Populated places in Bay of Kotor